Gullett  is a surname. Notable people with the surname include: 

Don Gullett (born 1951), American baseball player
Henry Gullett (1878–1940), Australian journalist and politician
Henry Gullett (New South Wales politician) (1837–1914), Australian journalist and politician
Jo Gullett (1914–1999), Australian soldier, politician, diplomat and journalist
Joseph Gullett, American politician in Georgia
Lucy Gullett, (1876–1949), Australian medical practitioner and philanthropist
William W. Gullett (1922–2015), first County Executive of Prince George's County, Maryland, US

See also
Benjamin D. Gullett House, historic structure in Eutaw, Alabama
Gallet (disambiguation)
Gillet
Gillett (disambiguation)
Gillette (disambiguation)
Goulet (disambiguation)
Guillet
Gullit